Edmund Nachamayl (some sources N'Camail)  was a long serving Dean of Armagh: he was in post from 1505 until his death on 21 January 1549.

References

Deans of Armagh
16th-century Irish Roman Catholic priests